Ashi Pema Dechen (1918–1991) was the Queen consort of Bhutan.

Early life
Ashi Pema Dechen was born in 1918 at Wangducholing Palace to Chumed Zhalgno, Dasho Jamyang (of the Tamzhing Choji family – also known as the Myo family -) and Ashi Decho, daughter of Ashi Yeshay Choden (who was the sister of Druk Gyalpo Gongsar Ugyen Wangchuck).

She had two full-brothers and two full-sisters, and another half-siblings by the second marriages of her parents:

 Dasho Gonpo Dorji, Chumed Zhalgno. 
 Ashi Phuntsho Choden (1911–2003).
 Dasho Lam Nado (1920–1989).
 Ashi Chimi.

From an early age, Ashi Pema Dechen received a traditional education.

Marriage and family
She married Bhutan's second king, a cross cousin, Jigme Wangchuck, in 1932 when she was 14 years old. They were second cousins. Ashi Pema Dechen was the half-sister of the maternal grandfather of the current Queen of Bhutan, Jetsun Pema, and she was the great grandmother of the Fifth Druk Gyalpo, Jigme Khesar Namgyel Wangchuck. 

Her elder sister, Ashi Phuntsho Choden (1911–2003), was the first wife of her husband since 1923 when she was 12 years old, at Thinley Rabten Palace, Phodrang.

Her children with the Second Druk Gyalpo were:

 Princess (Druk Gyalsem) Choki Wangmo Wangchuck (born 1937).
 Prince (Druk Gyalsey) Namgyel Wangchuck, 26th Penlop of Paro (born 1943).
 Princess (Druk Gyalsem) Deki Yangzom Wangchuck (born 1946).
 Princess (Druk Gyalsem) Pema Choden Wangchuck (born 1949).

Death
She died in 1991 at Samchoeling Palace.

Ancestry

References

Notes

1918 births
1991 deaths
Bhutanese monarchy
Wangchuck dynasty